Road signs in Pakistan are modelled on the British road sign system, with an exceptional difference being that they are bilingual and contain messages in Urdu, the national language, and English, and in some cases, the local regional or provincial languages. Pakistan drives on the left side of the road and follows the left-hand traffic system. Vehicles must be overtaken on their right.

There have often been complaints about road signs and infrastructure not being up to date in some parts of the country, with a traffic report in 2008 disclosing that local governments in many cases have not addressed damaged, vanished or outdated road regulatory signs. In Lahore alone, the report estimated that at least Rs. 800 million were required to furnish all scanty road signs in the city.

Gallery
List of traffic signs for controlling the traffic

Compulsory signs
Following are the compulsory signs.

Warning signs
Following are the warning signs.

Informative signs
Following are the informative signs.

See also

 Transport in Pakistan
 National Highways of Pakistan

References

External links
 Highway and Motor Code with Traffic Signs (Urdu)
 Road Signs by Islamabad Traffic Police

 
Road transport in Pakistan